Mount Asahi can refer to:

 Asahidake, the tallest mountain of Hokkaidō
 Mount Asahi (Ishikari), a hill outside Asahikawa, Hokkaidō
 Mount Asahi (Yamagata)